Tirumalai may refer to:

Geography 
Tirumala Venkateswara Temple, Andhra Pradesh, India
Tirumalai, a mountain and Jain site near Polur, Tamil Nadu, India

See also
Thirumalai, 2003 Indian Tamil film starring Vijay